Krestena is a town and a community in Elis, West Greece, Greece. Since the 2011 local government reform it is part of the municipality Andritsaina-Krestena, of which it is the seat of administration. Krestena is situated in the low hills between the river Alfeios and the Ionian Sea. It is 2 km southeast of Makrisia, 6 km south of Olympia, 12 km north of Zacharo and 18 km southeast of Pyrgos. In 2011, the population of the town was 1,864, and of the community, which includes the villages Poros and Moschoula, 2,356. The town has a kindergarten, schools, a lyceum, a gymnasium, a center of environmental training, two churches, restaurants, banks, a police station, a fire brigade, a medical center and a post office. Greek National Road 76 (Kallikomo - Andritsaina - Megalopoli) passes west of the town. Samiko beach is located approximately 6 kilometers to the southeast and the thermal springs of Kaiafas are 11 kilometers to the south.

Population

References

External links

GTP Krestena

Populated places in Elis